Cui Xiaotong (born 21 November 1994) is a Chinese rower.

She won a medal at the 2019 World Rowing Championships.

On 28 July 2021, she and three teammates won the gold medal in women's quadruple sculls at the 2020 Summer Olympics in Tokyo with 6:05.13, setting the new WB. It is the second time China won the Olympic gold medal in this event.

References

External links

1994 births
Living people
Chinese female rowers
World Rowing Championships medalists for China
Olympic rowers of China
Rowers at the 2020 Summer Olympics
Medalists at the 2020 Summer Olympics
Olympic gold medalists for China
Olympic medalists in rowing
20th-century Chinese women
21st-century Chinese women